The Clipper was a weekly labor-orientated newspaper published in Hobart, Tasmania, from 8 April 1893 until 25 December 1909, before its merger with the Daily Post in 1910.

History 
Its first editor was James Paton, a Christian socialist. Walter Alan Woods became editor and part owner in 1903, until the newspaper merged with the Daily Post in 1910.

The paper has been digitised as part of the Australian Newspapers Digitisation Project by the National Library of Australia.

See also 
 List of newspapers in Australia

Footnotes

External links 
 

1893 establishments in Australia
1909 disestablishments in Australia
Australian labour movement
Defunct newspapers published in Tasmania
Newspapers on Trove
Publications disestablished in 1909
Publications established in 1893
Socialist newspapers
Newspapers in Hobart, Tasmania
Weekly newspapers published in Australia